Karl Enderlin (1 August 1923 – 23 November 2004 in Zürich) was a Swiss figure skater. He was a four-time (1940–1942, 1945) Swiss national champion. He represented Switzerland at the 1948 Winter Olympics where he placed 14th.

Results

References

 
 List of Historical Swiss Champions

Swiss male single skaters
Olympic figure skaters of Switzerland
Figure skaters at the 1948 Winter Olympics
1923 births
2004 deaths